The Kong Meng San Phor Kark See Monastery (also the Bright Hill Pujue Chan Monastery), is a Buddhist temple and monastery in Bishan, Singapore. Built by Zhuan Dao in the early 20th century to propagate Buddhism and to provide lodging for monks, this monastery is the largest Buddhist temple in Singapore. It is the parent organization of the Buddhist College of Singapore founded in 2006. It is one of the two private crematoria, while the other one is Tse Toh Aum Temple.

History
Between 1920 and 1921, the Phor Kark See Monastery was built on the a plot of land in Thomson Road donated by Tay Woo Seng, a Chinese businessman. It was the first traditional Chinese monastery to be built in Singapore. Since Phor Kark See Monastery is situated at Kong Meng San ("Bright Hill", formerly "Hai Nan Mountain"), it has come to be known as "Kong Meng San Phor Kark See Monastery". The original temple consisted of a two-storey building, a shrine room, a visitors' room and living quarters. The Monastery expanded steadily over time as philanthropists like Aw Boon Haw and Aw Boon Par donated funds to the monastery for its expansion.

In 1947, Hong Choon became the monastery's abbot, after the death of its founding abbot, Zhuan Dao. Under his leadership, the monastery's complex expanded from two shrine halls to include the Pagoda of 10,000 Buddhas and prayer halls with a total area that are as large as ten football fields. He also progressively developed and expanded the monastery with his followers into the largest and most majestic place of practice in Singapore.

In 1980, the temple began to build Evergreen Bright Hill Home, which opened in 1983, with the donation of S$5.3 million from Hong Choon's followers, He Hui Zhong's family's company.

On 15 January 2002, the temple announced a Compassion Fund to provide financial assistance to retrenched workers with a last drawn pay of up to $2,500, and who do not qualify for other aid schemes.

On 5 June 2004, Kwang Sheng became the monastery's present abbot. Under Kwang Sheng's leadership, the Dharma Propagation Division was set up for Singaporeans to learn Buddhism and practice Dharma. The Youth Ministry KMSPKS Youth, was set up to serve as a platform for Singaporean youths who want to know about Buddhism, learn Buddhism and serve the society via Buddhist teachings.

In May 2007, Kwang Sheng released a musical album titled Buddha Smiles. In the same year in October 2007, the temple was one of seven religious groups ordered by the Commissioner of Charities (COC) to open their books to auditors. With an annual income of S$14.95 million, it had one of the largest incomes among the charities under the COC's direct purview. Its main income sources were crematorium and columbarium services, prayer services and donations. Between November 2007 and June 2008, the monastery also reportedly gave free meals to about 200 people daily, clarifying their prayer and meditation practices instead of relying on probable means of incomes such as exorcism.

On 21 June 2008, the temple raised over S$1 million for the reconstruction of schools devastated in the 12 May Sichuan earthquake, by organizing the Great Compassion; Great Aspiration Charity Show.

In April 2009, the temple launched Gum, an English-language magazine, to bridge the gap between their older Hokkien-speaking devotees and English-speaking youth. The magazine title is a transliteration of a Hokkien term which means "to get along", and symbolises unity within the congregation. The temple partnered Chuan Pictures, a new production house set up in March 2009 by local filmmaker Royston Tan, for a 15-minute Mandarin short film, "Little Note". It premiered in September 2009 and focuses on a single mother who gives her son inspirational notes.

In December 2014, KMSPKS Youth led their first overseas humanitarian mission into Chiang Mai, Thailand.

Monastery 

The monastery premises consist of stupas, prayer halls, crematorium and columbarium which houses over 200,000 niches, bell and drum towers, and an outdoor statue of Avalokitesvara stands between the Dharma Hall and the Pagoda of 10,000 Buddhas. The Hong Choon Memorial Hall of the temple was built in 2004.

Another notable feature of the monastery is a Bodhi Tree which had its sapling brought from the sacred Bodhi tree at Anuradhapura, Sri Lanka, which was itself brought as a sapling from the sacred Bodhi Tree of Bodh Gaya, India where Shakyamuni Buddha was said to have attained enlightenment.

The large bronze Buddha statue located in the temple's Hall of No Form is one of Asia's largest Buddha statue, with a height of 13.8 metres and weighing 55 tons. 

In 2014, a S$12 million four-story carpark with about 200 spaces that was added. 

A new four-storey, $1 million eco-friendly burner was installed in 2014 to improve air quality problems during Qingming Festival.

Buddhist College of Singapore 
Kong Meng San Phor Kark See Monastery opened the Buddhist College of Singapore on 13 September 2006. As the country's Buddhist college, it offers a four-year bachelor's degree in Buddhism. Lessons were held on temple grounds until a new S$35 million five-storey building is completed. 

The building was supposed to be completed in 2015 but was delayed due to poor weather and manpower issues.  The building was completed in 2016 and opened by Prime Minister Lee Hsien Loong on 10 September 2016.

In 2014, the Buddhist College of Singapore operated by the monastery announced intentions of accepting female monastics, with the new nunnery campus housed at Poh Ern Shih Temple, taking in 45 students every two years.

Events
The monastery celebrates Vesak Day annually with a variety of ceremonies such as "Bathing the Buddha", and "Three-Steps-One-Bow". Other major events include the Qingming Festival.

See also
 Buddhism in Singapore
 List of Buddhist temples

References

External links

1921 establishments in Singapore
Buildings and structures in Bishan, Singapore
Buddhist temples in Singapore
Chinese-Singaporean culture
Columbaria in Singapore
Religious organizations established in 1921
Tourist attractions in Central Region, Singapore